Luke May (born 23 August 1989), also known by the nickname of "The Force" (May the Force be with you"), is an English rugby league footballer who last played for the London Skolars in Co-operative Championship One, as a .

Background
May was born in Ashford, Surrey, England.

Career
He previously played in the Super League with the Harlequins RL.

References

External links
(archived by web.archive.org) Harlequins Rugby League profile

1989 births
Living people
Doncaster R.L.F.C. players
English rugby league players
London Broncos players
London Skolars players
People from Ashford, Surrey
Rugby league centres
Rugby league players from Surrey